Naria turdus, common name : the thrush cowrie, is a species of sea snail, a cowry, a marine gastropod mollusk in the family Cypraeidae, the cowries.

Subspecies
The following forms or varieties have been described:
 Naria turdus dilatata (Dunker, R.W., 1852)
 Naria turdus distinguenda  (Lamarck, J.B.P.A. de, 1810)
 Naria turdus micheloi Chiapponi, 2009
 Naria turdus pardalina  (Dunker, R.W., 1852)
 Naria turdus turdus (Lamarck)
 Naria turdus winkworthi Schilder, F.A. & M. Schilder, 1938

Description
They are quite variable in pattern and color. The shape is more or less oval, the dorsum surface is smooth and shiny, the basic color is whitish, yellowish or greenish, with small brown spots all over, becoming larger on the sides. The interior of the shell, visible through the aperture, may be light purple. The subspecies Naria turdus dilatata usually bears a large irregular patch on the dorsum. The margins are white, with several brown dots and a pronounced labial 'callus'. The base is white or pale pink, sometimes with a small brown mark in the middle. The long and wide aperture shows about 15 teeth on the columellar and labial teeth. The shells of Naria turdus are externally quite similar to Naria lamarckii. In the living cowries the mantle is yellowish or beige, with long tree-shaped brown papillae.

Distribution
The thrush cowry is distributed in the Red Sea, in the Gulf of Oman and in the North West of the Indian Ocean, along Pakistan, India, in the East Africa (Comores, Eritrea, Kenya, Madagascar, Mozambique, Oman, Somalia, Tanzania), in the East Coast of South Africa and - as a non-indigenous species - in European waters and in the Mediterranean Sea (Lampedusa, Israel, Djerba Island in Tunisia, Libya, Egypt), where it has been introduced through the Suez Canal. 

This species has also been found as an introduced species in the Caribbean starting in the early 2020s. It has been observed in Aruba, Bonaire, Venezuela, Costa Rica, and Puerto Rico.

Habitat
In the Indian Ocean they prefer the coral reef, while in the Mediterranean Sea they can be found on algal turf or sandy and muddy sea bed.

References

 Schilder, F.A. (1927). Revision der Cypraeacea (Moll. Gastr.). Archiv für Naturgeschichte. 91A(10): 1-171.
 Verdcourt, B. (1954). The cowries of the East African Coast (Kenya, Tanganyika, Zanzibar and Pemba). Journal of the East Africa Natural History Society 22(4) 96: 129-144, 17 pls
 Streftaris, N.; Zenetos, A.; Papathanassiou, E. (2005). Globalisation in marine ecosystems: the story of non-indigenous marine species across European seas. Oceanogr. Mar. Biol. Annu. Rev. 43: 419-453
 Chiapponi M. (2009). A lessepsian subspecies of Erosaria turdus (Lamarck, 1810) (Mollusca: Gastropoda: Cypraeidae) . Acta Conchyliorum, 10: 95-101
 Heiman E.L. (2014) Erosaria turdus singeri, a new subspecies. Triton 29: 12-14.
 Lorenz, F. (2017). Cowries. A guide to the gastropod family Cypraeidae. Volume 1, Biology and systematics. Harxheim: ConchBooks. 644 pp.

External links
 Lamarck [J.B.M.de. (1810). Sur la détermination des espèces parmi les animaux sans vertèbres, et particulièrement parmi les Mollusques testacés. Annales du Muséum d'Histoire Naturelle. 15: 20-40; [Suite des espèces du genre Cône] 263-286, 422-454; [Suite du genre Porcelaine] 16: 89-114]
 Dillwyn, L.W. (1823). An index to the Historia conchyliorum of Lister: with the name of the species to which each figure belongs, and occasional remarks. [ii + xiii + 48 pp., 1059 figs + 22 pls. Clarendon Press, Oxford]
 Rochebrune, A.-T. (1884). Monographie des formes appartenant au genre Monetaria. Bulletin de la Société Malacologique de France. 1: 73-102
 Gray, J.E. (1824-1828). Monograph on the Cypraeidae, a family of testaceous Mollusca. Zoological Journal. 1(1): 71-80, pl. 7 [March 1824; 1(2): 137-152 [June 1824]; 1(3): 367-391, pl. 12]
 Dunker, W. (1852). Diagnoses Molluscorum novorum. Zeitschrift für Malakozoologie. 9: 125-128
 Perry, G. (1811). Conchology, or the natural history of shells: containing a new arrangement of the genera and species, illustrated by coloured engravings executed from the natural specimens, and including the latest discoveries. 4 pp., 61 plates. London.
 Sowerby, G. B., I; Sowerby, G. B., II. (1832-1841). The conchological illustrations or, Coloured figures of all the hitherto unfigured recent shells. London, privately published.
 Sowerby, G. B., II. (1870). Monograph of the genus Cypraea. In G. B. Sowerby II (ed.), Thesaurus conchyliorum, or monographs of genera of shells. Vol. 4 (26-28): 1–58, pls 292–328. London, privately published
 Biolib
 Ciesm
 Clade

Cypraeidae
Gastropods described in 1810